"Cross Road Blues" (also known as "Crossroads") is a blues song written and recorded by American blues artist Robert Johnson in 1936. Johnson performed it as a solo piece with his vocal and acoustic slide guitar in the Delta blues-style. The song has become part of the Robert Johnson mythology as referring to the place where he supposedly sold his soul to the Devil in exchange for his musical talents, although the lyrics do not contain any specific references.

Bluesman Elmore James revived the song with recordings in 1954 and 1960–1961. English guitarist Eric Clapton with Cream popularized the song as "Crossroads" in the late 1960s. Their blues rock interpretation inspired many cover versions and the Rock and Roll Hall of Fame included it as one of the "500 Songs That Shaped Rock and Roll". Rolling Stone placed it at number three on the magazine's list of the "Greatest Guitar Songs of All Time" in recognition of Clapton's guitar work.

Recording
In October 1936, Johnson auditioned for music store owner and sometime talent scout H. C. Speir in Jackson, Mississippi; Speir passed on Johnson's contact information to Ernie Oertle, who was a representative for ARC Records.  After a second audition, Oertle arranged for Johnson to travel to San Antonio, Texas, for a recording session.  Johnson recorded 22 songs for ARC over three days from November 23 to 27, 1936.  During the first session, he recorded his most commercially appealing songs.  They mostly represented his original pieces and reflected current, piano-influenced musical trends.  The songs include "Terraplane Blues" (his first single and most popular record) along with "Sweet Home Chicago" and "I Believe I'll Dust My Broom", which became blues standards after others recorded them.

A second and third recording date took place in San Antonio after a two-day break.  The material Johnson chose shows more variety than that for his first date and he reached back into his long-standing repertoire for songs to record. The material reflects the styles of country blues performers Charley Patton and Son House, who influenced Johnson in his youth and are among Johnson's most heartfelt and forceful.

"Cross Road Blues" was recorded during Johnson's third session in San Antonio, on Friday, November 27, 1936.  The sessions continued at an improvised studio in Room 414 at the Gunter Hotel.  ARC producer Don Law supervised the recording and used a portable disc cutting machine.  It is unknown what input, if any, Law had into Johnson's selection of material to record or how to present it.  Two similar takes of the song were recorded.

Lyrics and interpretation
 
A crossroads or an intersection of rural roads is one of the few landmarks in the Mississippi Delta, a flat featureless plain between the Mississippi and Yazoo rivers. It is part of the local iconography and various businesses use the name, such as gas stations, banks, and retail shops.  A crossroads is also where cars are more likely to slow down or stop, thus presenting the best opportunity for a hitchhiker.  In the simplest reading,  Johnson describes his grief at being unable to catch a ride at an intersection before the sun sets.  However, many see different levels of meaning and some have attached a supernatural significance to the song.

Both versions of the song open with the protagonist kneeling at a crossroads to ask God's mercy, while the second sections tells of his failed attempts to hitch a ride.  In the third and fourth sections, he expresses apprehension at being stranded as darkness approaches and asks that his friend Willie Brown be advised that "I'm sinkin' down". The first take of the song, which was used for the single, includes a fifth verse that is not included in the second take. In it he laments not having a "sweet woman" in his distress.

The song has been used to perpetuate the myth of Johnson selling his soul to the Devil for his musical ability.  The lyrics do not contain any references to Satan or a Faustian bargain, but they have been interpreted as a description of the singer's fear of losing his soul to the Devil (presumably in exchange for his talent).  Music historians believe that Johnson's verses do not support the idea.  Delta bluesman Tommy Johnson (no relation to Robert) promoted himself as having made a deal with the Devil and Southern folklore identifies a crossroads or graveyard as the site of such a pact, which Wald identifies as likely sources of the myth.  However, Johnson later recorded two songs that include Satanic references: in "Hellhound on My Trail" tells of trying to stay ahead of the demon hound which is pursuing him and in "Me and the Devil Blues" he sings, "Early this mornin' when you knocked upon my door, and I said 'Hello Satan I believe it's time to go'".  These songs contribute to the Faustian myth; how much Johnson promoted the idea is debated, although many agree "the 'devil angle' made for good marketing".

Blues historian Samuel Charters sees the song as having elements of protest and social commentary.  The second verse includes "the sun goin' down now boy, dark gon' catch me here", a reference to the "sundown laws" or curfew during racial segregation in the United States.  Signs in the rural South advised "Nigger, don't let the sun set on you here".  Johnson may be expressing a real fear of trumped up vagrancy charges or even lynchings that still took place.  Others suggest that the song is about a deeper and more personal loneliness.  Writers Barry Lee Pearson and Bill McCulloch argue that the fifth verse in the single version captures the essence of the song: "left alone, abandoned, or mistreated, he stands at the crossroad, looking this way or that for his woman".

Composition

"Cross Road Blues" reflects Johnson's Delta blues roots and may have been in his repertoire since 1932. It is the first recording to show his mastery of his mentor Son House's style, particularly in his slide guitar work.  Music historian Edward Komara identifies parts of "Straight Alky Blues" by Leroy Carr and Scrapper Blackwell (1929) along with Roosevelt Sykes' subsequent adaptation as "Black River Blues" (1930) as melodic precedents.  However, Johnson infuses their relaxed urban approach with a more forceful rural one.  Komara terms Johnson's guitar playing a "blues harp style".  It contrasts with Johnson's finger-picking "piano style", which uses a boogie-style accompaniment on the bass strings while playing melody and harmonies on the higher strings.  Harp-style playing employs sharp percussive accents on the bass strings (an imitation of the sharp draw used by harmonica players) and allows Johnson to explore different chordings and fills.  Johnson uses this technique for "Terraplane Blues", which shares many common elements with "Cross Road Blues".

The song's structure differs from a well-defined twelve-bar blues. The verses are not consistent and range from fourteen to fifteen bars in length.  Additionally, the harmonic progression is often implied rather than stated (full IV and V chords are not used).  Johnson uses a Spanish or open G tuning with the guitar tuned up to the key of B.  This facilitates Johnson's use of a slide, which features as prominently in the song as the vocal. The slide parts function more as a second "answer" vocal than accompaniment, with the tension underscoring the dark turmoil of the lyrics. Charters characterizes the song's rhythm as ambiguous, imparting both a 4/4 time and 8/8 feel.  Music writer Dave Headlam elaborates on Johnson's rhythm:

The two takes of the song are performed at moderate, but somewhat different tempos.  Both begin slower and speed up; the first is about 106 beats per minute (bpm), while the second is about 96 bpm.  Johnson prepares to go into the fifth section for the slower second take, but the engineer apparently cut him off because of the time limits of ten-inch 78 rpm records.  In addition to the slower tempo, Johnson sings the verses at a lower pitch, although both takes are in the same key.  This allows for greater variation and nuance in the vocal.  Together with refinements to some guitar parts, the differences serve to help further distinguish the second take from "Terraplane Blues" and give it more of its own character.

Releases
ARC and Vocalion Records issued the first take of "Cross Road Blues" in May 1937 on the then standard 78 rpm record. With the flip side "Ramblin' on My Mind", it was the third of eleven singles released during Johnson's lifetime. Vocalion's budget labels Perfect Records and Romeo Records also released the single for sale by dime stores. Although sales figures are not available, the record was "widely heard in the Delta" and Johnson's tunes were found in jukeboxes in the region.

As with most of Johnson's recordings, "Cross Road Blues" remained out of print after its initial release until The Complete Recordings box set in 1990. The second take was released in 1961, when producer Frank Driggs substituted it for the original on Johnson's first long-playing record album compilation King of the Delta Blues Singers. This take was also included on the 1990 Complete Recordings (at 2:29, it is 10 seconds shorter than the original 2:39 single version).

Elmore James versions
American blues singer and guitarist Elmore James, who popularized Robert Johnson's "Dust My Broom", recorded two variations on "Cross Road Blues".  Both titled "Standing at the Crossroads", they feature James' trademark "Dust My Broom" amplified slide-guitar figure and a backing ensemble.  James' lyrics focus on the lost-love aspect of the song:

James first recorded the song in August 1954 at Modern Records' new studio in Culver City, California.  Maxwell Davis supervised the session and a group of professional studio musicians provided the backup.  The song was produced in a newer style that Modern used successfully for B.B. King and James' slide guitar was placed further back in the mix.  Flair Records, another of the Bihari brothers' Modern labels, released the single, backed with "Sunny Land".  The song became a regional hit, but did not reach the national charts.  Labels associated with Modern included "Standing at the Crossroads" on several James compilation albums, such as Blues After Hours (Crown), The Blues in My Heart – The Rhythm in My Soul (Custom Records), and Original Folk Blues (Kent Records).

In 1959, producer Bobby Robinson signed James to his Fury/Fire/Enjoy group of labels.  In addition to new material, Robinson had James revisit several of his older songs, including "Standing at the Crossroads".  James re-recorded it at Beltone Studios in New York City in late 1960 or early 1961 during one of his last sessions.  Studio musicians again provided the backup and the horn section included baritone saxophone by Paul Williams.  Bell Records' subsidiary labels released the song after James' death in 1965 – Flashback Records released a single with a reissue of "The Sky Is Crying" and Sphere Sound Records included it on a James compilation album also titled The Sky Is Crying.  Both the 1954 and 1960–1961 versions appear on numerous later James compilations.

Homesick James, who recorded and toured with his cousin Elmore, also recorded a rendition titled "Crossroads".  Homesick derived his guitar style from Elmore, which music critic Bill Dahl describes as "aggressive, sometimes chaotic slide work".  Unlike Elmore, however, he uses most of the lyrics from Johnson's second take, which had been first issued in 1961.  The July 23, 1963, recording session produced Homesick's only single for Chicago-based USA Records, "Crossroads" backed with "My Baby's Sweet".

Eric Clapton/Cream interpretation

Background
In early 1966, while still with John Mayall's Bluesbreakers, Eric Clapton adapted the song for a recording session with an ad hoc studio group, dubbed Eric Clapton and the Powerhouse.  Elektra Records producer Joe Boyd brought together Steve Winwood on vocals, Clapton on guitar, Jack Bruce on bass guitar, Paul Jones on harmonica, Ben Palmer on piano, and Pete York on drums for the project.  Boyd recalled that he and Clapton reviewed potential songs; Clapton wanted to record Albert King's "Crosscut Saw", but Boyd preferred to adapt an older country blues.  Their attention turned to Robert Johnson songs and Boyd proposed "Crossroads" and Clapton chose "Traveling Riverside Blues".

For the recording, Clapton developed an arrangement using lyrics from both songs with an adaption of the guitar line from the latter.  Biographer Michael Schumacher describes the Powerhouse's performance as slower and more blues-based than Cream's. Elektra released the 2:32 recording, titled "Crossroads", on the compilation album What's Shakin' in June 1966.  After the Powerhouse session, Clapton continued playing with Mayall.  Author Marc Roberty lists "Crossroads" in a typical set for the Bluesbreakers in the spring of 1966.

Cream version

"Crossroads" became a part of Cream's repertoire when Clapton began performing with Jack Bruce and Ginger Baker in July 1966. Their version features a prominent guitar riff with hard-driving, upbeat instrumental backing and soloing.  Clapton previously recorded "Ramblin' on My Mind" with Mayall and "From Four Until Late" with Cream using arrangements that followed Johnson's original songs more closely.  However, he envisioned "Crossroads" as a rock song:

Clapton simplifies Johnson's guitar line and sets it to a straight eighth-note or rock rhythm.  He and Bruce on bass continuously emphasize the riff throughout the song to give it a strong and regular metric drive combined with Baker's drumming.  Johnson's irregular measures are also standardized to typical twelve-bar sections in which the I–IV–V blues progression is clearly stated.  Clapton does not adapt Johnson's slide guitar technique or open tuning; instead he follows the electric guitar soloing approach of B.B. King and Albert King.  However, he employs a Johnson guitar innovation, the duple shuffle pattern or boogie bass line, while singing (Johnson only used it for two bars in "Cross Road Blues").

Clapton also simplifies and standardizes Johnson's vocal lines. Schumacher calls Clapton's vocal on "Crossroads" his best and most assured with Cream.  In addition to Johnson's opening and closing lyrics, he twice adds the same section from "Traveling Riverside Blues":

During the instrumental break, Cream takes an improvisational approach characteristic of their later live performances.  Bruce's bass lines blend rhythm and harmony and Baker adds fills and more complex techniques typical of drummers in jazz trios.  However, the momentum is never allowed to dissipate and is constantly reinforced.  Cash Box called it "a new winner" for Cream and added "the blazing instrumental break gives this track a luster which will bring home the sales".

Recording and releases
Cream recorded the song on November 28, 1966, for broadcast on the BBC Guitar Club radio program.  At less than two minutes in length, Clapton only sings the first and last sections, with his guitar solo replacing the middle "Traveling Riverside Blues" verse.  It appeared on bootleg albums before finally being released in 2003 on BBC Sessions.  On March 10, 1968, Cream recorded it again during a concert at the Winterland Ballroom in San Francisco.  The song became the opening number on the live half of Cream's Wheels of Fire double album, released in August 1968 by Polydor Records in the UK and Atco Records in the US.  After the group's breakup, Atco issued the song as a single in January 1969, which reached number 28 on the US Billboard Hot 100 pop chart and 17 on Cashbox. Both the original album and single credit the songwriter as Robert Johnson or R. Johnson, although Clapton and Cream extensively reworked the song.

Cream played "Crossroads" during their final concert at the Royal Albert Hall on November 26, 1968. The expanded version of Cream's Farewell Concert film released in 1977 contains the performance.  During their 2005 reunion, Cream revisited the song at the Royal Albert Hall and it is included on the Royal Albert Hall London May 2-3-5-6, 2005 album and video.  After Cream's breakup in 1968, Clapton continued to perform "Crossroads" in a variety of settings.  Live recordings appear on Live at the Fillmore (with Derek and the Dominos), Crossroads 2: Live in the Seventies, The Secret Policeman's Other Ball, and other albums. Clapton has also used the name for the Crossroads Centre, a drug rehabilitation facility he founded, and for the Crossroads Guitar Festivals to benefit it.

Editing on album version
Clapton biographer Schumacher notes "Given the passion of the solo performances on 'Crossroads,' it seems almost miraculous that Cream is able to return to the song itself."  Several music writers have explained that Cream's recording for Wheels of Fire was edited from a much longer performance that was typical for the trioin the notes for Clapton's Crossroads box set, Anthony DeCurtis credits the trimming to engineer Tom Dowd, while critic Stephen Thomas Erlewine attributes the editing to producer Felix Pappalardi, who "cut together the best bits of a winding improvisation to a tight four minutes", to allow the song's drive more continuity. In a 1985 interview, Clapton was asked if the song had been edited.  He replied:

However, Barry Levenson, who produced Cream's 1997 box set Those Were the Days, asserts:

Recognition and influence
In 1986, Robert Johnson's "Cross Road Blues" was inducted into the Blues Foundation Hall of Fame.  Writing for the foundation, Jim O'Neal noted that "regardless of mythology and rock 'n' roll renditions, Johnson's record was indeed a powerful one, a song that would stand the test of time on its own".  In 1998, it received a Grammy Hall of Fame Award to acknowledge its quality and place in recording history.  Rolling Stone magazine ranked it at number 481 on its 2021 list of the "500 Greatest Songs of All Time".

In 1995, the Rock and Roll Hall of Fame listed Cream's "Crossroads" as one of the "500 Songs That Shaped Rock and Roll".  Rolling Stone placed it at number three on its list of "Greatest Guitar Songs of All Time". AllMusic's Richard Gilliam identifies Cream's "Crossroads" as the first recording to bring Robert Johnson to the attention of popular music audiences and allow reissues of his original recordings to sell over a million copies.  By combining elements of hard rock and blues, he adds it inspired "a new generation of blues-influenced artists".  Rock musicians have recorded numerous renditions based on Cream's arrangement.

Notes
Footnotes

Citations

References

1936 songs
1937 singles
Robert Johnson songs
Blues songs
Songs written by Robert Johnson
Songs about roads
1954 singles
Elmore James songs
1969 singles
Cream (band) songs
Song recordings produced by Felix Pappalardi
Atco Records singles
Polydor Records singles
Vocalion Records singles
Grammy Hall of Fame Award recipients
Song recordings produced by Don Law